Kimberly Paigion Walker (born September 27, 1986), better known mononymously as Paigion, is an American actress, radio and television personality. She is best known as the one-fourth of the new set of hosts of BET's 106 & Park from October 1, 2012 through May 2013.

On February 3, 2017, she appeared on MTV2's WorldStar TV. She now films skits and posts them on YouTube.

Early life
Walker was born in Oak Park, Michigan on September 27, 1986, and graduated from Ferndale High School in 2004. She graduated from Western Michigan University with a degree in film and media studies.

Career

Radio
Walker got her first break in radio as a high school reporter at the urban radio station WJLB ("FM 98"). She later landed a position in the promotions department at the urban radio station WGPR ("Hot 107.5"). where she worked her way into an on-air position. She has also served as a local producer for top radio programs such as, The Tom Joyner Morning Show and The Rickey Smiley Morning Show.

Television
In November 2011, Paigion received her first shot at television on BET's 106 and Park as a correspondent after a successful screen test. Shortly after, BET extended an offer to host their annual Notarized New Year's Eve video countdown show alongside Shorty da Prince. Paigion went on to make a total of 11 appearances on BET's 106 & Park as a correspondent. On May 29, 2012, Rocsi and Terrence J announced they would be leaving 106 & Park on September 28, 2012. On June 1, 2012, a nationwide search for the next hosts began and ended on October 1, 2012. Walker became one-fourth of the fourth set of hosts for BET's 106 & Park alongside Shorty da Prince, Bow Wow and Miss Mykie on October 1, 2012. She stopped appearing in May 2013.

Filmography

References

External links

1986 births
People from Oak Park, Michigan
Actresses from Michigan
American film actresses
American television actresses
American radio personalities
American television personalities
Living people
21st-century American women